Hishām ibn al-Kalbī, 737 AD – 819 AD/204 AH, also known as Ibn al-Kalbi, was an Arab historian. His full name was Abu al-Mundhir Hisham ibn Muhammad ibn al-Sa'ib ibn Bishr al-Kalbi. Born in Kufa, he spent much of his life in Baghdad. Like his father, he collected information about the genealogies and history of the ancient Arabs.

Hisham established a genealogical link between Ishmael and the Islamic prophet Muhammad, and put forth the idea that all Arabs were descended from Ishmael. He relied heavily on the ancient oral traditions of the Arabs, but also quoted writers who had access to Biblical and Palmyran sources.

In 1966, Werner Caskel compiled a two volume study of Ibn al-Kalbi's  ("The Abundance of Kinship") entitled Das genealogische Werk des Hisam Ibn Muhammad al Kalbi. It contains a prosopographic register of every individual mentioned in the genealogy in addition to more than three hundred genealogical tables based on the contents of the text.

Works
 
The Book of Idols (Kitab Al-Asnam)
The Abundance of Kinship (Jamharat Al-Ansab)

References

External links
Biodata at MuslimScholars.info

9th-century historians from the Abbasid Caliphate
9th-century deaths
737 births
819 deaths
People from Kufa
8th-century Arabs
9th-century Arabs
Banu Kalb
Iraqi genealogists